Herfy is a Saudi Arabian multinational fast food restaurant chain in Saudi Arabia and one of the largest in the Middle East, surpassing international chains in terms of presence. It has a total of more than 380 restaurants and 5,000 employees throughout Saudi Arabia.

The company has many subsidiaries including Herfy Bakery.

History 
Herfy was founded by Ahmed Al-Said in 1981.
In 1994, Panda United was acquired by Prince Waleed bin Talal's Kingdom Holding Company. Consequently, Panda's 70% stake in Herfy was transferred to Kingdom, bolstered by the new large budget provided by Kingdom.

In 1998, AlAzizia Panda United (Panda's new name) was acquired by The Savola Group, headed by Adel Al-Fakeh, and Herfy became part of the group. Herfy's growth again grew as the number of Herfy chains doubled.

Future and international projects 
Herfy recently opened its first overseas branch in Bahrain in cooperation with local partner Al Meer Trading. Franchise agreements in the U.A.E. and Kuwait have been concluded and more franchise requests have been received.

Herfy opened its first branch outside the Middle East in Bangladesh on December 22, 2017, where they are supposed to open 30 outlets within "a few years".
The first branch opened in Gulshan and four more branches later opened in Banani, Uttara, Mirpur, Dhanmondi and Bashundhara, Dhaka.

Herfy is now going to be opened in Nigeria, 50 Branches in the period of next 10 Years.

To cope with the added overseas branches, Herfy is planning to open its own SR13 million meat and chicken processing plant in a similar way to Herfy Bakery.

References

External links 

 
Herfy online delivery

Fast-food chains of Saudi Arabia
Saudi Arabian brands
Companies based in Riyadh
Restaurants established in 1981
Multinational companies headquartered in Saudi Arabia